Pintail may refer to:

Animals

Dabbling ducks
 Northern pintail (Anas acuta), sometimes called the pintail, the most common pintail species
 White-cheeked pintail (Anas bahamensis), from the Caribbean, South America and the Galápagos
 Yellow-billed pintail (Anas georgica), found from southern Colombia to South Georgia
 South Georgia pintail (Anas georgica georgica), the nominate race of the yellow-billed pintail
 Eaton's pintail (Anas eatoni), from the islands of Kerguelen and Crozet

Other animals
 Pin-tailed snipe (Gallinago stenura), a small stocky wader
Acisoma, a genus of dragonflies

Other uses
 Fairey Pintail, a British single-engined floatplane fighter
 Haynes Pintail canard-configuration ultralight aircraft
 Pintail Island, Nunavut, Canada
 Pin-tailed longboards, a type of skateboard
 USS Pintail (AMc-17), a U.S. Navy minesweeper 
 Pintail Duck, a Disney character in the Duck family

See also

Pin the tail on the donkey, traditional children's game

Animal common name disambiguation pages